Fulvivirga imtechensis is a Gram-negative, obligately aerobic rod-shaped and non-motile bacterium from the genus of Fulvivirga which has been isolated from the coast of Visakhapatnam in India.

References

External links
Type strain of Fulvivirga imtechensis at BacDive -  the Bacterial Diversity Metadatabase

Cytophagia
Bacteria described in 2012